Charles Lowther may refer to:

Sir Charles Lowther, 3rd Baronet (1803–1894)
Sir Charles Lowther, 4th Baronet (1880–1949)
Sir Charles Douglas Lowther, 6th Baronet (b. 1946), of the Lowther Baronets